Claude Davey (14 December 1908 – 18 February 2001) was a Wales international rugby union player who played club rugby for several teams, most notably Sale and Swansea. He was awarded 23 caps for Wales and captained his country eight times. Davey was a hard tackling centre and his most famous performance took place on 21 December 1935 when he led Wales to a historic 13–12 victory over the All Blacks at Cardiff.

Early career
Davey was one of the outstanding Welsh players of his generation, known for his impressive crash-tackling and strong running ability. He was often criticised for poor handling, but Davey tended to run onto the ball at speed requiring not only good timing but good passing from his teammates. When it failed it was classed as 'bad hands' but when it worked Davey would make distinct attacking headway. This style of play was described in 1930 by the Llanelly Mercury as 'he can do nothing except emulate a battering ram, and too often he forgets to take the ball with him'.

Davey first came to notice while playing for the Wales Secondary Schools, before gaining a place for a Wales University XV, while he was studying electrical engineering at Swansea University. His first club team, was 'the Mond' a colliery team that would later become Cwmgors, moving to Swansea in 1928. His first game for Swansea came in December of the same year against Skewen.

International rugby
Davey was called up for Wales at the end of the 1929/30 season in the final game of the tournament against France. In an extremely rough match Davey made a very good impression. He was called upon again the next season, though at this time he was playing for Sale. Davey made a name for himself in the 1931 game against Ireland in Belfast. Ireland only need to beat Wales to win the Triple Crown, but Davey and Jack Bassett tackled with such brutal aggression that the opposite centre retired with concussion and his replacement was later knocked unconscious. Davey not only subdued the Irish on their own soil but also scored a try himself and put his wing in for two more.

He first captained Wales against Scotland in 1934, and would captain his nation a further seven times.

International matches played
Wales
  1931, 1932, 1933, 1934, 1935, 1937, 1938
  1930, 1931
  1931, 1932, 1934, 1935, 1937, 1938
  1935
  1931, 1932, 1933, 1934, 1935, 1936
  1931

Bibliography

References

1908 births
2001 deaths
Barbarian F.C. players
London Welsh RFC players
Rugby union centres
Rugby union players from Garnant
Sale Sharks players
Swansea RFC players
Wales international rugby union players
Wales rugby union captains
Welsh rugby union players